Aliens of the Deep is a 2005 American documentary film directed in part by James Cameron alongside fellow cameraman and friend Steven Quale, and filmed in the IMAX 3D format. It was produced by Walden Media and Walt Disney Pictures. Cameron teams with NASA scientists to explore the mid-ocean ridges, submerged chains of mountains in the Atlantic and Pacific oceans that are home to some of the planet's more unusual forms of life.

It was released on DVD on November 1, 2005.

Synopsis
Cameron joins up aboard the Russian research vessel Akademik Mstislav Keldysh with a group of NASA scientists, as well as some American marine biologists, to investigate ten hydrothermal vents in both the Atlantic and Pacific. The vents have their own unique ecosystem, which support diverse organisms such as giant tube worms, swarms of blind white crabs, and vast amounts of shrimp which are capable of "seeing" water that is heated by the vents. These creatures do not require sunlight like other organisms, and instead obtain their energy from the vents. They are able to survive in the superheated and sulfurous water. Because of this, the documentary suggests that this is what life beyond Earth might look like. As some alien ecosystems are likely to be a lot harsher than a typical terrestrial ecosystem, these exotic vents provide an insight into some of the forms that alien life might take.

The documentary shows Cameron's passion for exploring the oceans, as well as his interest in extraterrestrial life. It also showcases the technology employed to reach such depths.

The film is similar to Cameron's earlier documentary, Ghosts of the Abyss (2003), which involves him journeying to the wreck of the RMS Titanic. It too was filmed in the 3-D IMAX format.

See also
List of 3D films (2005 onwards)
Mir (submersible)

References

 – The companion book to the film

External links

2005 films
2005 documentary films
Walt Disney Pictures films
Disney documentary films
Films directed by James Cameron
Walden Media films
2005 3D films
American 3D films
3D short films
Films directed by Steven Quale
IMAX documentary films
3D documentary films
2000s English-language films
2000s American films